is a Japanese manga series written and illustrated by Sei Fukui. It was serialized in Shogakukan's shōnen manga magazine Weekly Shōnen Sunday from May 2021 to July 2022, with its chapters collected in six tankōbon volumes.

Publication
Written and illustrated by Sei Fukui, Kakeau Tsukihi was serialized in Shogakukan's shōnen manga magazine Weekly Shōnen Sunday from May 12, 2021, to July 6, 2022. Shogakukan collected its chapters in six tankōbon volumes, released from August 18, 2021, to August 18, 2022.

Volume list

Reception
The series ranked 5th on the Publisher Comics' Recommended Comics of 2022.

References

External links
 

Comedy anime and manga
Shogakukan manga
Shōnen manga
Slice of life anime and manga